That's My Man is a 1947 American drama film directed by Frank Borzage, written by Steve Fisher and Bradley King, and starring Don Ameche, Catherine McLeod, Roscoe Karns, John Ridgely, Kitty Irish and Joe Frisco. It was released on June 1, 1947, by Republic Pictures.

Plot
Joe Grange quits his job as a Los Angeles accountant and gambles the last of his savings on a racehorse. He literally gambles as well, winning $2,000 at one point, then losing it all when his cab driver friend Toby Gleeton bets everything on the favorite rather than on Joe's longshot of a horse, Gallant Man.

Toby has helped introduce Joe to the love of his life, Ronnie Moore, who puts up with Joe's gambling for a while. But when she expects a child, even Joe's winning of a house doesn't make her trust his ways. Joe is too busy playing poker to be there when son Richard is born, and he's suckered by horse trainer John Ramsey into betting $40,000 on a race, blowing it all.

Having lost his wife and money, Joe is desperate to put things right. When he hears Ronnie is entering Gallant Man in a $100,000 race at Hollywood Park, he tries to stop her before she loses everything. It turns out she knew exactly what she was doing, and even forgives Joe after their horse's victory.

Cast
  
Don Ameche as Joe Grange
Catherine McLeod as Ronnie Moore / Grange
Roscoe Karns as Toby Gleeton
John Ridgely as Ramsey
Kitty Irish as Kitty
Joe Frisco as Willie Wagonstatter
Gregory Marshall as Richard Grange
Dorothy Adams as Millie
Frankie Darro as Jockey
Hampton J. Scott as Sam
John Miljan as Secretary
William B. Davidson as Monte 
Joe Hernandez as Race Track Announcer
Ray Walker as Gambler

References

External links
 

1947 films
American black-and-white films
1947 romantic drama films
American romantic drama films
Films produced by Frank Borzage
Films directed by Frank Borzage
Films scored by Hans J. Salter
Republic Pictures films
1940s American films